NGC 265 is an open cluster of stars in the southern constellation of Tucana. It is located in the Small Magellanic Cloud, a nearby dwarf galaxy. The cluster was discovered by English astronomer John Herschel on April 11, 1834. J. L. E. Dreyer described it as, "faint, pretty small, round", and added it as the 265th entry in his New General Catalogue.

It has a combined 4,200 times the mass of the Sun and is around 250 million years old. The metallicity of the cluster – what astronomers term the abundance of elements with higher atomic number than helium – is at around −0.62, or only 24% of that in the Sun.

See also 
 NGC 290

References

External links 

ESA Hubble space telescope site: Hubble picture in information on NGC 265
HubbleSite NewsCenter: Information on NGC 265 and the Hubble picture

Open clusters
Small Magellanic Cloud
Tucana (constellation)
0265
18340411